Kwon Eun-kyung (born 10 July 1985) is a South Korean taekwondo practitioner. 

She won a bronze medal in bantamweight at the 2009 World Taekwondo Championships. Her achievements at the Asian Championships include a gold medal in 2006, and a bronze medal in 2008. She won a gold medal at the 2006 Asian Games, and a bronze medal at the 2010 Asian Games.

References

External links

1985 births
Living people
South Korean female taekwondo practitioners
Taekwondo practitioners at the 2006 Asian Games
Taekwondo practitioners at the 2010 Asian Games
Asian Games medalists in taekwondo
Medalists at the 2006 Asian Games
Medalists at the 2010 Asian Games
Asian Games gold medalists for South Korea
Asian Games bronze medalists for South Korea
World Taekwondo Championships medalists
Asian Taekwondo Championships medalists
21st-century South Korean women